The 2019 GT World Challenge Asia (known for sponsorship reasons as the 2019 Blancpain GT World Challenge Asia) was the third season of SRO Motorsports Group and Team Asia One GT Management's GT World Challenge Asia, an auto racing series for grand tourer cars in Asia. The races were contested with GT3-spec and GT4-spec cars. The season began on 6 April at Sepang and ended on 28 September at Shanghai. It was the first season of the unification of GT3 sprint series across the globe under the World Challenge name.

Calendar
At the annual press conference during the 2018 24 Hours of Spa on 27 July, the Stéphane Ratel Organisation announced the first draft of the 2019 calendar. Ningbo was replaced by Korea. The dates for the races at Shanghai were confirmed on 11 December.

Entry list

GT3

GT4

Race results
Bold indicates overall winner.

Championship standings
Scoring system
Championship points are awarded for the first ten positions in each race. Entries are required to complete 75% of the winning car's race distance in order to be classified and earn points. Individual drivers are required to participate for a minimum of 25 minutes in order to earn championship points in any race.

Drivers' championships

Overall

Silver Cup

Pro-Am Cup

Am Cup

Teams' championship
Only the two best results of a team per race counted towards the Teams' championship.

See also
2019 GT Series
2019 GT Series Endurance Cup
2019 GT World Challenge America
2019 GT World Challenge Europe

Notes

References

External links

GT World Challenge Asia